Carlton, Wharfedale is a civil parish in the metropolitan borough of the City of Leeds, West Yorkshire, England.  The parish contains three listed buildings that are recorded in the National Heritage List for England. All the listed buildings are designated at Grade II, the lowest of the three grades, which is applied to "buildings of national importance and special interest".  The parish contains the small villages of East Carlton and West Carlton, and is otherwise rural.  The listed buildings consist of a hall-house, a farmhouse, and a school later used as a church.


Buildings

References

Citations

Sources

 

Lists of listed buildings in West Yorkshire